Cubicle is an album by pianist Walter Bishop Jr. which was recorded in 1978 and released on the Muse label in 1979.

Reception 

Ron Wynn of AllMusic stated "The fine bop pianist heads a large group of distinguished stars ... It's a different atmosphere for Bishop, usually featured in small combos or trios. The songs are nicely played, and there are several sparkling solos".

Track listing 
All compositions by Walter Bishop Jr. except where noted
 "Valley Land" – 6:34
 "My Little Suede Shoes" (Charlie Parker) – 4:50
 "Those Who Chant" – 7:08
 "Summertime" (George Gershwin, DuBose Heyward) – 8:06
 "Now, Now That You've Left Me" (Mitch Farber) – 6:35
 "Cubicle" – 4:12

Personnel 
Walter Bishop Jr. – piano
Randy Brecker – trumpet, flugelhorn
Curtis Fuller – trombone
Rene McLean – soprano saxophone, alto saxophone, tenor saxophone
Pepper Adams – baritone saxophone
Joe Caro – guitar
Bob Cranshaw, Mark Egan (tracks 1 & 4) – Fender bass
Billy Hart – drums
Ray Mantilla – percussion
Carmen Lundy – vocals (track 1)
Mitch Farber – arranger

References 

Walter Bishop Jr. albums
1978 albums
Muse Records albums